Alterkeys is an online marketplace where accommodation in Europe can be listed and booked for short term lettings. Based on the peer-to-peer property rental model, the platform allows individuals and property managers to list their unoccupied accommodation space and connect with travellers looking for short term accommodation to rent. By June 2013, over 50,000 properties across Europe were listed on the platform.  The accommodation options listed on Alterkeys include apartments, castles and villas. In June 2014, the company reached 100,000 properties all around Europe.

History 

Alterkeys was founded by Chema Gonzalez, Joan Muni and Patricia Gonzalez in November 2011. Through 2012 and 2013 the company received investment from private investors in the UK and Spain. In June 2013, Alterkeys was announced as the winner of the Lanzadera Acceleration Programme, a prize applied for by over 4,200 business projects around the world. The program gave the company the opportunity to grow their business with the help of development specialists and private capital. Alterkeys has offices in Madrid, Seville and London.

Product 

Alterkeys uses a collaborative model, as it allows property owners and travelers to connect, share and rent out their properties. It also accepts the listing of a range of unique accommodation types including castles, houseboats, tree houses and mobile homes. It does not charge a booking fee to guests. Commission is only taken from the payment received by hosts from successful bookings; however it is entirely free for hosts to list their properties on the platform. The service is used by thousands of individuals and companies like Huawei.

News 
 Award for Technical Economical Viability by Madrid Council in October 2012. 
 Actualidad Económica Spanish Magazine Award to the best 100 ideas from companies. 
 Alterkeys was chosen by Huawei to lodge.

References

Companies established in 2011
Online marketplaces of Spain
Internet properties established in 2011
Travel and holiday companies of Spain